Les Méchins is a municipality in Quebec, Canada, about  east of Matane along Quebec Route 132.

In addition to Les Méchins (formerly known as Grands-Méchins) itself, the municipality also includes the communities of Anse-des-Méchins, Cherbourg, Cherbourg-Centre, Les Îlets Méchins, and Petits-Méchins.

The name Méchins is of uncertain origin although according to one theory, it may come from the French word méchants, meaning "wicked", and referring to rocks in the sea that would make navigation there dangerous.

History

Colonization began in 1859 when three families arrived. By 1865, it had grown to 119 inhabitants. The Mission of Saint-Édouard was established in 1876 and the following year, the area was incorporated as the United Township Municipality of Dalibaire-et-Romieu. In 1880, the chapel was completed and its registers were opened. From that year onward, the place experienced a development boom due to the founding of a herring smokehouse and maritime industry, including ship building in the late 19th century.

While Méchins became a separate municipality in 1952, it was not until 1982 that the current Municipality of Méchins was formed through the merger of Méchins with Saint-Paulin-Dalibaire (formed in 1954) and Saint-Thomas-de-Cherbourg (formed in 1954).

Demographics

Mother tongue:
 English as first language: 0.5%
 French as first language: 98.5%
 English and French as first language: 0.5%
 Other as first language: 0.5%

See also
 List of municipalities in Quebec

References

Incorporated places in Bas-Saint-Laurent
Municipalities in Quebec
Populated places established in 1859